Alexandre Remi Picard (born July 5, 1985) is a Canadian former professional ice hockey defenceman who played in the National Hockey League (NHL).

Playing career
As a youth, Picard played in the 1999 Quebec International Pee-Wee Hockey Tournament with the Outaouais Intrepides minor ice hockey team.

Picard began his career by playing major junior hockey for the Halifax Mooseheads of the QMJHL. The team was highly successful while he was there, even helping them reach the President's Cup finals in 2002–03. In fact, following that season, he was one of eight players on the team chosen in 2003 NHL Entry Draft. However, he was among several players traded to the Cape Breton Screaming Eagles, but returned to the Mooseheads for his final season in the QMJHL.

Following the post-season, Picard went to Philadelphia, and began to work-out with the Philadelphia Phantoms, the AHL affiliate of the Philadelphia Flyers, who were in the Calder Cup finals. When teammate Randy Jones was injured in game two, he was signed to an amateur tryout contract to fill the roster spot. So, Picard played alongside veteran John Slaney in about a dozen shifts in games three and four to help the Phantoms sweep the Chicago Wolves.

A month later, the Flyers announced that they had signed Picard to a three-year contract to fill the spot left on the Phantoms roster by Patrick Sharp. So, Picard played his first full professional season for the Phantoms, and also played six games for the Flyers in four stints. He was also called up to be backup for the Flyers during the 2006 Stanley Cup Playoffs.

Picard began the 2006–07 NHL season with the Phantoms, but after just six games, he was called up to replace the injured Mike Rathje and began his rookie season in the NHL. Picard proved he could stay in the NHL when, on February 1, 2007, he recorded five assists in a game against the New Jersey Devils, setting a new rookie record and nearly tying the franchise record set by Eric Lindros.

Picard was dealt to the Tampa Bay Lightning on February 25, 2008 (along with a draft pick), for forward Vaclav Prospal.

On August 29, 2008, Picard was traded to the Ottawa Senators along with Filip Kuba and a first round draft pick for Andrej Meszaros. On February 12, 2010, Picard, who had been a healthy scratch for much of the season, along with Ottawa's second round pick in the 2010 NHL Entry Draft, were traded to the Carolina Hurricanes in exchange for Matt Cullen.

On July 31, 2010, Picard signed a one-year contract with the Montreal Canadiens.

On July 5, 2011, Picard was signed to a one-year, two-way contract with the Pittsburgh Penguins worth $600,000 at the NHL level. He split the 2011–12 season between Pittsburgh and AHL affiliate, the Wilkes-Barre/Scranton Penguins, appearing in 17 NHL games for 4 assists.

Picard who was in a familiar role as a free agent at season's end, embarked upon a European career, signing with Czech club, HC Lev Praha of the Kontinental Hockey League. Picard followed his season in the KHL with stints in Austria and Germany before continuing his journeyman career by signing a two-year contract with Swiss club, HC Fribourg-Gottéron of the NLA on June 19, 2015.

When his contract was up in Switzerland, he moved back to Germany, signing with DEL outfit Düsseldorfer EG in April 2017.

Following his second season with DEG in 2018–19 and after a first round defeat to Augsburger Panther, Picard announced his retirement from a 14-year professional playing career.

Career statistics

Awards and honours

References

External links

 

1985 births
Living people
Canadian ice hockey defencemen
Carolina Hurricanes players
Cape Breton Screaming Eagles players
Düsseldorfer EG players
HC Fribourg-Gottéron players
Graz 99ers players
Halifax Mooseheads players
Ice hockey people from Gatineau
ERC Ingolstadt players
HC Lev Praha players
Montreal Canadiens players
Norfolk Admirals players
Ottawa Senators players
Philadelphia Flyers draft picks
Philadelphia Flyers players
Philadelphia Phantoms players
Pittsburgh Penguins players
Tampa Bay Lightning players
Wilkes-Barre/Scranton Penguins players
Canadian expatriate ice hockey players in the Czech Republic
Canadian expatriate ice hockey players in Austria
Canadian expatriate ice hockey players in Germany
Canadian expatriate ice hockey players in Switzerland
Canadian expatriate ice hockey players in the United States